was a Japanese voice actor.

Notable voice roles

Anime
Animation Kikou Marco Polo no Boken as Varieties
Avenger as Old Man
Case Closed as Shitara
Code Geass: Lelouch of the Rebellion R2 as Gaohai (eps 1 - 3)
Gintama as Superior (Ep. 84–85)
Heat Guy J as Mauro
Kimba the White Lion as Kenichi
Master Keaton as Andy (ep 23); Tonio (ep 2)
Noein - to your other self as Professor Sasaki (ep 10, 18)
Pénélope tête en l'air as Grandpa
Rainbow Sentai Robin as Pegasus

OVA
.hack//Liminality as Kyoko's Father (ep 3)
801 T.T.S. Airbats as Colonel Yumioka
Bubblegum Crash as Foreman (Ep 3)
Genesis Survivor Gaiarth (Ep 2)

Movies
Alakazam the Great as Sanzo-hoshi
Doraemon: Nobita's Space Heroes as Grandpa

External links
 
 Nobuaki Sekine at 81Produce (Japanese)

1934 births
2021 deaths
Japanese male voice actors
Male voice actors from Tokyo